The following is a timeline of the history of the German city of Leipzig.

Prior to 18th century

 920 AD - Emperor Henry the Fowler "built a castle here about 920." 
 1082 - Leipzig sacked by forces of Vratislaus II of Bohemia.
 1134  - Leipzig "came into the possession of Conrad, Margrave of Meissen".
 1165
 Leipzig granted market and city privileges.
 St. Nicholas Church built (approximate date).
 1170 - Easter and Michaelmas fairs begin (approximate date).
 1212 - Thomasschule zu Leipzig and Thomanerchor founded.
 1231 - Klosterkirche St. Pauli built.
 1409 - University of Leipzig founded.
 1420 - Fire.
 1458 - New year's fair begins.
 1479 - Printing press in operation.
 1485 - Treaty of Leipzig.
 1496 - St. Thomas Church consecrated.
 1519 - June: Martin Luther and Andreas Karlstadt debate John Eck.
 1530 - Auerbachs Keller built (approximate date).
 1539 - "Leipsic formally espoused the Protestant cause."
 1542 - Leipzig Botanical Garden first established.
 1543 - Leipzig University Library established.
 1547
 City besieged by John Frederick I of Saxony.
 Pleissenburg re-built, replaced in 1905 by the New Town Hall.
 1554 - Moritzbastei constructed.
 1556 - Old City Hall built.
 1631 - Battle of Breitenfeld (1631).
 1642 - Battle of Breitenfeld (1642).
 1650 - Einkommende Zeitungen (newspaper) begins publication.
 1680 - Plague.
 1681 - Weidmannsche Buchhandlung relocates to Leipzig.
 1687 - Alte Handelsbörse (trade exchange) was built.
 1693 - Opera house opens.
 1699 - Population: 15,653.

18th century
 1701 - Oil-fuelled street lighting introduced.
 1702 - Collegium Musicum founded.
 1704 - Romanus house built.
 1710 - King Augustus II the Strong first presented Meissen porcelain at the local fair.
 1717 - What became Schillerhaus first built. 
 1723
 Breitkopf publishing established.
 Johann Sebastian Bach begins as Kapellmeister (music director) at St. Thomas Church 
 1724 - Premiere performance of Bach's St John Passion.
 1729 - Premiere of Bach's St Matthew Passion.
 1731 - Zedler's Universal-Lexicon encyclopedia published.
 1745 - City "taken by the Prussians."
 1750 - Death of Johann Sebastian Bach Kapellmeister of St. Thomas Church 
 1755 -  (municipal library) opens.
 1756 - City occupied by Prussian forces during the Seven Years' War.
 1759
 August: "Prussians withdraw from Leipzig."
 September: "Prussians recapture Leipzig."
 1760 - October: "Prussians withdraw from Leipzig."
 1764 - Academy of Visual Arts and  founded.
 1766 - Theater auf der Rannischen Bastei opens.
 1768 -  founded by Józef Aleksander Jabłonowski.
 1777 - April: Premiere of Klinger's play Sturm und Drang.
 1781
 Gewandhaus built.
 Leipzig Gewandhaus Orchestra formed.
 1784
 City fortifications dismantled.
 Philological Society founded.
 1785 - Augustusplatz laid out.
 1789 - Linnean Society founded.
 1790 - Observatory set up in Pleissenburg.
 1797 - 31,847.
 1798
 Tauchnitz publishers established.
 Allgemeine musikalische Zeitung (music magazine) begins publication.

19th century
 1800 - Edition Peters and Leipzig Singakademie (chorus) established.
 1801 - Population: 31,887.
 1807
 Friedrich Hofmeister Musikverlag (publisher) founded.
  (newspaper) begins publication.
 1810 - Westermann Verlag founded.

 1813
 22 May: Richard Wagner born.
 October: Battle of Leipzig.
 1825 -  formed.
 1826
 Consulate of the United States established.
 Wool market active.
 1828
 Reclam Verlag established.
  founded.
 1829 - Medical Society founded.
 1830 - "Political disturbance."
 1831
 November: Establishment of a committee to help Polish insurgents fleeing the Russian Partition of Poland after the unsuccessful Polish November Uprising. Collection of funds to help Poles, mainly among guilds and city guards.
 Flight of Polish insurgents from the Russian Partition of Poland to the Great Emigration through the city begins.
 1832
 January: Mass escape of Polish insurgents from the Russian Partition of Poland through the city.
 January: Polish national hero Józef Bem expelled from the city by authorities fearful of stirring up a revolution.
 July: The committee to help Poles officially closed, although its members continued their activities in the following years.
 1833 - Accession to the Zollverein.
 1835 - Felix Mendelssohn becomes music director of Leipzig Gewandhaus Orchestra.
 1836 - Augusteum built.
 1837 -  (art association) established.
 1839 - Leipzig–Dresden railway opened.
 1842 - Leipzig Bayerischer Bahnhof built.
 1843
 Illustrirte Zeitung (newspaper) begins publication.
 Conservatory of Music founded.
  erected.
 1844 - Museum of Antiquities of Leipzig University on display.
 1846
 1 July: Saxonian Academy of Sciences and Humanities founded.
 29 August: Hôtel de Pologne fire.
 1848
 "Museum of Fine Arts" founded.
 Hôtel de Pologne rebuilt as the city's largest hotel.
 "Political disturbance."
 1850 - Bach Gesellschaft organized.
 1853 - Blüthner piano manufacturer in business.
 1856 - Händel-Gesellschaft organized.
 1858 - Municipal museum inaugurated.
 1861 - Population: 78,495.
 1863 - General German Workers' Association founded in Leipzig.
 1864 - Schrebergärten (community garden) association formed.
 1866 - Austro-Prussian War leads to Prussian occupation in 1866–67.
 1868 - Opera house built.
 1869
 Leipzig Museum of Ethnography founded.
 Leipzig Alpine Club founded.
 1872
 Harrassowitz publishing firm established.
 Verlag Karl Baedeker relocates to Leipzig.
 Trams in Leipzig start.
 1874
 Museum of Arts and Crafts founded. 
 Ernst Eulenburg (musical editions) established.
 Bibliographisches Institut relocates to Leipzig.
 1878
 Leipzig Zoo opens.
 "Leipzig is growing into an industrial town of the first rank."
 1879
 Reichsgericht headquartered in Leipzig.
 Südfriedhof established.
 1880 - Population: 149,081.
 1884 - Leipziger Baumwollspinnerei founded.
 1886
 Georg Thieme Verlag established.
 1889 -  and  become part of city.
 1890
 Eutritzsch, Gohlis, Neureudnitz, Neuschönefeld, Neustadt, Sellerhausen, Thonberg, and Volkmarsdorf become part of city.
 Population: 295,025.
 1891
 Leipzig University Library opens in relocation.
 1892
  becomes part of city.
 SSV Stötteritz football club founded.
 Mendelssohn monument erected.

 1894 - Leipziger Volkszeitung (newspaper) begins publication.
 1895
 Reichsgericht (supreme court) established. 
  built.
 Muster-Messe fair begins.
 Population: 399,995.
 1898 - Handelshochschule Leipzig founded.
 1900 - Population: 456,156.

20th century

 1901
 Städtisches Kaufhaus built.
  (publisher) in business.
 1904 - Bachfest begins.
 1905
 Reudnitz, Volkmarsdorf, Gohlis, Eutritzsch, Plagwitz and Lindenau were incorporated with the city.
 New Town Hall opens. The Old Town Hall is going to house the Museum of the History of the City of Leipzig.
 Population: 503,672.
 1906
 Naturkundemuseum Leipzig established.
 Leipzig Prison built.
 1907 - Edeka founded at Hôtel de Pologne.
 1908 - Rowohlt Verlag founded.
 1912 - German National Library established.
 1913
 Kurt Wolff Verlag (publisher) in business.
 Monument to the Battle of the Nations erected.
 1915
 Leipzig Hauptbahnhof and Alfred-Kunze-Sportpark open.
  and Schönefeld become part of city.
 1916
 German National Library building opened.
 Institute for Newspaper Research (Institut für Zeitungskunde) was founded at the University of Leipzig
 1917
 January: Leipziger Verkehrsbetriebe (city transport company) formed.
 February: American Consulate closed. Its building became a temporary residence for Americans and Allied refugees from Serbia, Romania and Japan.
 Hôtel de Pologne closed.
 1918 -  becomes mayor.
 1919
 Church Music Institute founded.
  begins publication.
 Population: 604,397.
 1921
 Leipzig War Crimes Trials held.
 December: American Consulate reopened.
 1922
 , Leutzsch, and  become part of city.
 Bruno-Plache-Stadion opens.
 Goldmann (publisher) founded.
 1923
 1 January: Consulate of Poland opened.
 MDR Symphony Orchestra founded.
 1927 - Leipzig/Halle Airport opened.
 1929 - Museum of Musical Instruments of the University of Leipzig opens.
 1930 - Abtnaundorf, Knautkleeberg, Schönau, and Thekla become part of city.
 1933 - Population: 713,470.
 1935 -  becomes part of city.
 1936 -  and  become part of city.

 1938 - Expulsion of Polish Jews by Nazi Germany. 1,300 Polish Jews sheltered in the Polish Consulate and saved from deportation.
 1939
 September: Mass arrests of local Polish activists (see also Nazi crimes against the Polish nation).
 September: Polish Consulate seized by Germany during the invasion of Poland at the start of World War II. Confiscation of the Polish Consulate's library.
 1941 - German-ordered closure of the American Consulate.
 1943
 6 March: Leipzig-Thekla subcamp of the Buchenwald concentration camp established. Over 1,800 men, mostly Soviet, Polish, French, Belgian and Czechoslovak, were held there as slave labour.
 December: Bombing of city by British.
 1944
 Bombing.
 11 May: Leipzig-Engelsdorf subcamp of the Buchenwald concentration camp established. Over 250 men, mostly Polish, Russian, Czech and Ukrainian, were held there.
 9 June: HASAG Leipzig subcamp of the Buchenwald concentration camp established. Over 5,000 women and children, mostly Polish, Soviet, French and Jewish, were held there.
 22 August: Leipzig-Schönau subcamp of the Buchenwald concentration camp established. Over 500 Jewish women were held there.
 15 November: Subcamp of Buchenwald for men established at the HASAG factory. Around 700 men, mostly Jewish, French and Italian, were held there.
 24 November: Leipzig-Engelsdorf subcamp dissolved. Prisoners deported to Wansleben am See and Rothenburg.
 1945
 17 February: 600 prisoners brought to the Leipzig-Thekla subcamp from a subcamp of the Gross-Rosen concentration camp in Jasień.
 13 April: Leipzig-Thekla, Leipzig-Schönau and both HASAG subcamps dissolved. Most prisoners sent on death marches.
 18 April: Massacre of remaining prisoners of the Leipzig-Thekla subcamp perpetrated by the Gestapo, SS and Volkssturm. Some prisoners were saved by Polish prisoners of another camp.
 April: Allied ground advance arrives.
 July: City under Soviet control.
 Population: 584,593.
 1950
 International Johann Sebastian Bach Competition begins.
 Bach-Archiv founded.
 Population: 617,574.
 1951 -  becomes mayor.
 1953 - Theaterhochschule Leipzig established, later named after Hans Otto
 1954
  (archives) founded.
 Zentralstadion built.
 1955 - Festival of Cultural and Documentary Films begins.
 1956 - Zentralstadion opens.
 1959 -  becomes mayor.
 1960
 Opera house built.
 Chess Olympiad held.
 Population: 589,632.
 1969
 6 February: Polish Institute founded.
 Leipzig-Halle S-Bahn established.
 1970 -  becomes mayor.

 1972
 Polish Consulate reopened.
 City-Hochhaus Leipzig built.
 1974 - Moritzbastei rebuilt.
 1977 - Sportmuseum founded.
 1983 -  erected.
 1989 - Monday demonstrations.
 1990
  (art association) founded.
 Hinrich Lehmann-Grube becomes mayor.
 1991
 Euro-scene Leipzig theatre festival begins.
 Mendelssohn House, Leipzig opens.
 1992
 Technischen Hochschule founded.
 Wave-Gotik-Treffen begins.
 Leipzig-Altenburg Airport opens.
 American Consulate reopened.
 1993 - Hartmannsdorf becomes part of city.
 1994 - Museum of Antiquities of the University of Leipzig opens.
 1995
 Lausen and Plaussig become part of city.
 Population: 471,409.
 1996
 Leipzig Trade Fair building opens.
 Saxonia International Balloon Fiesta begins.
 1997
  (city utility company) established.
 Federal Administrative Court of Germany headquartered in Leipzig.
 1998
 Podelwitz-Süd becomes part of city.
 Wolfgang Tiefensee becomes mayor.
 1999 - Böhlitz-Ehrenberg, Engelsdorf, Holzhausen, Liebertwolkwitz, Lindenthal, Miltitz and Mölkau become part of city.

21st century
 2000 - Burghausen und Rückmarsdorf become part of city.
 2002
 Arena Leipzig built.
 Games Convention begins.
 2004
 Leipziger Internet Zeitung begins publication.
 Museum der bildenden Künste opens.
 Leipzig Botanical Garden renovated.
 Leipzig is the German candidate city for the 2012 Summer Olympics
 2005
 Art galleries open in Leipziger Baumwollspinnerei.
 BMW Central Building constructed.
 City hosts the 2005 World Fencing Championships.
 Population: 502,651.
 2006
 Amazon.com distribution centre begins operating.
 Burkhard Jung becomes mayor.
 2007
 Paulinum reconstruction begins.
 July: City hosts the 2007 World Archery Championships.
 2010
  (museum) active.
 German Music Archive relocates to Leipzig.
 2012
  reported.
 Paulinum reconstruction finished.
 2013
 New Propsteikirche begins construction.
 Leipzig City Tunnel opened.
 Leipzig is the most livable German city.
 2014 - Population: 551,871.
 2015
 January: Patriotic Europeans Against the Islamisation of the Occident demonstration.
 Erfurt–Leipzig/Halle high-speed railway opened.
 2017
 July: City hosts the 2017 World Fencing Championships.
 December: City co-hosts the 2017 World Women's Handball Championship.
 2018 - Leipzig wins the European Cities of Future prize in the category of "Best Large City for Human Capital & Lifestyle"
 2019 - Leipzig is European City of the Year

See also
 Leipzig history
 
 List of mayors of Leipzig
 

Other cities in the state of Saxony:
 Timeline of Chemnitz
 Timeline of Dresden

References

This article incorporates information from the German Wikipedia.

Bibliography

in English
 
 
 
 
 
 
  + 1873 ed.

in German
  (bibliography)
  (includes city timeline)

External links

 
 
 Links to fulltext city directories for Leipzig via Wikisource
 Europeana. Items related to Leipzig, various dates.
 Digital Public Library of America. Items related to Leipzig, various dates

 
Leipzig